Yeshaq (died 1578) was the Bahr Negus, or ruler of the Medri Bahri, during the mid to late 16th century A subordinate of Ethiopian Emperor Dawit II, he was noted for supporting Gelawdewos during the Ethiopian-Adal war, and rebelling against his successors.

Reign
Bahr Negus Yeshaq first appears in history about the time the Portuguese fleet arrived at Massawa in 1541. When Christovão da Gama marched inland with his 400 matchlockmen, Yeshaq not only provided him provisions and places to camp in his realm, but also about 500 soldiers and information about the land. The father of the Bahr negus, who had despaired of the rightful Emperor being restored to power and had come to be a valuable supporter of Ahmed Gragn, sought pardon from Gelawdewos, offering Imam Ahmad's son in exchange; despite the Emperor's anger at the man's betrayal, out of respect for the Bahr negus, who had provided critical help in getting the Portuguese expedition into Ethiopia, Gelawdewos consented to the offer. The Bahr Negus also joined Emperor Gelawdewos in the decisive Battle of Wayna Daga, where Ahmad ibn Ibrahim al-Ghazi, the leader of the Adal Sultanate, was killed and his forces scattered.

When the Ottoman general Özdemir Pasha, who had been made governor of the Ottoman province of Habesh, crossed over from Jeddah in 1557 and occupied Massawa, Arqiqo and finally Debarwa, the capital of the Medri Bahri, reinforced by a massive support of army and commanders by Gelawdewos, the Abyssinians forces scored a victory against the invaders, recapturing Debarwa and seizing the "immense treasure" the invaders piled up within.
Although Bahr Negus Yeshaq enjoyed good relations with Emperor Galawdewos, his relations with his brother and nephew were not as positive. In 1560, the year after Menas became emperor, Bahr Negus Yeshaq revolted against the new Emperor and invaded Tigray, Emperor Menas defeated Yeshaq and drove him out out of Tigray and Yeshaq was forced to seek refuge at the ottomans in Massawa. In return for ceding the town of Debarwa, Özdemir Pasha extended military support to the exiled Bahr Negus, and Yeshaq led an army into Tigray and the other northern provinces.

Despite that Emperor Menas managed to defeated, or at least put to flight, both Bahr Negash Yeshaq and his Ottoman allies.

When Sarsa Dengel the Great was made emperor, Yeshaq at first pledged his loyalty, but within a few years he once more went into rebellion, and found another ally in the ruler of Harar, Sultan Mohammed IV Mansur. Despite these alliances, Emperor Sarsa Dengel defeated and killed Yeshaq in battle in 1578.
 Richard Pankhurst concurs with the judgement of James Bruce on Yeshaq, who points out that the status of the Bahr Negus "was much diminished by Yeshaq's treachery. From then onwards the governor of the provinces beyond the Tekezé was not allowed the sandaq (Banner) and nagarit (War Drum), and no longer had a place in Council unless especially called on by the Emperor."

Notes

Bibliography
 

1578 deaths
Military personnel killed in action
16th-century African people
Year of birth unknown